Street Poetry is the Finnish rock band Hanoi Rocks's eighth and final studio album. The album reached the top 10 on the Finnish charts, and succeeded very well elsewhere in Europe too. The first single spawned was "Fashion", and the second was an internet-only single "This One's for Rock'n'Roll". The album's release was celebrated at the Tavastia Club with three live shows, which were followed by a tour across Scandinavia, England and Japan.

The album's title comes from a time when the original Hanoi Rocks were living in London. A drifter was living in the London Underground Ladbroke Grove-station, where he wrote poems of things he saw. He was called a "Street Poet", and hence the title "Street Poetry".

Some reviews said that the album was Hanoi Rocks' first real rock record since the 80's.

Track list

Personnel 
Hanoi Rocks
Michael Monroe – lead vocals, saxophone, harmonica, piano
Andy McCoy – lead guitar, piano, backing vocals
Conny Bloom – rhythm guitar, backing vocals
Andy Christell – bass, backing vocals
Lacu – drums

Chart positions

Album

Singles

References 

Hanoi Rocks albums
2007 albums